The Ilik River Fortification II near Yona, Guam was built by Japanese forces during World War II.  It was listed on the U.S. National Register of Historic Places in 1991.

It is a pillbox located about 100 meters from an entrance to Ylig Bay, 30 meters inland from the high tide line, and about 50 meters above sea level. The fortification consists of three partial sides of a structure made of coral pieces cemented together, a construction technique introduced to the island during its colonial Spanish administration.

See also
National Register of Historic Places listings in Guam

References

Buildings and structures on the National Register of Historic Places in Guam
World War II on the National Register of Historic Places in Guam
1940s establishments in Guam